The monkfish is a name for fishes of the anglerfish genus Lophius.

Monkfish may also refer to:

 Inspector Monkfish, a fictional character
 Sea monk, a marine monster of the Renaissance 
 Squatina squatina, a shark with an unusually flattened body
 Stargazer, also called monkfish in New Zealand